The 2015 South Australian National Football League (SANFL) grand final was played at the Adelaide Oval on Sunday, 27 September 2015, to determine the 2015 SANFL premiership team.

Teams
This was the first time the two teams have played each other in the SANFL Grand Final.  defeated the premiership favourites  by 30 points to claim their ninth premiership overall and first since 1983 (thirty-two years, the second-longest premiership drought in SANFL history).

Woodville-West Torrens won their way into the club's 9th Grand Final after defeating West Adelaide 11.13 (79) to 9.11 (65) in the Second Semi-final. A week later, West Adelaide defeated  15.8 (98) to 6.9 (45) in the Preliminary Final to advance to the club's 18th SANFL Grand Final.

Entertainment
Australian alternative rock band You Am I provided the pre-game entertainment.

Team Lists
The two teams named to play in the Grand Final are as follows.

 Scott Lewis played his 150th SANFL game after debuting for West Adelaide in 2005.

 Daniel Webb played his 100th SANFL game since debuting for West Adelaide in 2009

Scorecard

Form
Head to head  -  WWT 42 / WA 25 / Draw 1

Last three encounters:
2015 Rnd 2: WA 15.5 (95) d WWT 14.5 (89)
2015 Rnd 12: WWT 14.4 (88) d WA 10.13 (73)
2015 2nd SF: WWT 11.13 (79) d WA 9.11 (65)

References 

SANFL Grand Finals
SANFL Grand Final, 2015